The 1873–74 Football Association Challenge Cup was the third staging of the FA Cup, England's oldest football tournament. Twenty-eight teams entered, twelve more than the previous season, although six of the twenty-eight never played a match.

Format

First round: The 28 teams would play. The winners would move on.

Second round: The remaining 14 teams would play. The winner would move on.

Third round: 6 teams, with Swifts getting a bye, would play.

Semi-final: The 4 teams would play.

Final: The two semi-final teams would face each other. The winner would be crowned champion

Calendar

First round

Replays

Second round

Replays

Third round

Replay

Semi-finals

Both semi-finals were played at Kennington Oval, London.

Final

References
 FA Cup Results Archive

1873-74
FA
FA Cup